Tommaso Toffoli is an Italian-American professor of electrical and computer engineering at Boston University where he joined the faculty in 1995. He has worked on cellular automata and the theory of artificial life (with Edward Fredkin and others), and is known for the invention of the Toffoli gate.

Early life and career 
He was born in June, 1943 in Montereale Valcellina, in northeastern Italy, to  Francesco and Valentina (Saveri) Toffoli  and was raised in Rome. He received his laurea in physics (equivalent to a Master's degree) from the University of Rome La Sapienza in 1967.

Toffoli moved to the United States in 1969.

In 1976 he received a Ph.D. in computer and communication science from the University of Michigan, then in 1978 he joined the faculty of Massachusetts Institute of Technology as a principal research scientist, where he remained until 1995, when he joined the faculty of Boston University.

Books
 Cellular Automata Machines: A New Environment for Modeling, MIT Press (1987), with Norman Margolus. .

See also
Billiard-ball computer
Block cellular automaton
CAM-6
Computronium
Critters (cellular automaton)
Programmable matter
Reversible cellular automaton

References

External links
Homepage 
Google Scholar profile

1943 births
Italian electrical engineers
Italian emigrants to the United States
Living people
Cellular automatists
University of Michigan alumni
Massachusetts Institute of Technology faculty
Boston University faculty
Sapienza University of Rome alumni
New England Complex Systems Institute
Quantum information scientists
American electrical engineers
Computer engineers

People from Friuli-Venezia Giulia